R. Bruce Hoadley (1933 – October 15, 2019) was Professor Emeritus of Building and Construction Materials in the Department of Environmental Conservation at the University of Massachusetts Amherst.

His main research interests were wood identification and dimensional changes due to wood-moisture relationships.  He is known to the general public primarily as the author of popular books on the anatomy, properties and processing of wood, and for his work as a contributing editor and technical consultant for Fine Woodworking magazine. His expertise in wood identification has been utilized in analysis of antique furniture and art objects for Sotheby's and major museums.

His book Identifying Wood: Accurate results with simple tools is an accessible introduction to the topic, and his Understanding Wood is a comprehensive treatment of wood technology.  The first edition of this work sold over 130,000 copies.

Publications

References

External links 
 Faculty profile at U Mass Amherst

Forestry academics
American woodworkers
1933 births
2019 deaths
University of Massachusetts Amherst faculty